Asura bipars is a moth of the  family Erebidae. It is found in Queensland and New South Wales.

The wingspan is about 20 mm. Adults are black with yellow spots.

References

bipars
Moths of Australia
Fauna of New South Wales
Moths described in 1865